Plachkovtsi is a town in central Bulgaria, part of Tryavna municipality, Gabrovo Province.

Towns in Bulgaria
Populated places in Gabrovo Province